The Amer Fakhoury Foundation is a 501(c)(3) human rights organization working for US citizens forcefully detained in other countries.

History 
Amer Fakhoury, a restaurant owner in Dover, New Hampshire, fled Lebanon in 2000 and relocated in the United States due to war and turmoil. In September 2019, he travelled to Lebanon on a family vacation. His passport was seized, and he was accused of decades-old murder and torture charges. He was released on March 19, 2020, and returned to the US, where he died in August 2020.

The Amer Fakhoury Foundation was established by the family of Fakhoury in 2019. The goal of the organization is to be a support network for people like their dad and their families. The organization held a Washington DC protest and paid for all the families of hostages. The protest was featured in a documentary about hostages in The Washington Post. In 2021, Fakhoury's four daughters went to Washington, where they met with State Department officials and US Senator Ted Cruz, a Texas Republican who had worked with New Hampshire Democrat Jeanne Shaheen on a bill to ban visas and freeze assets of Lebanese officials involved in Fakhoury's detention.

The foundation also organized a demonstration outside the White House in 2021 for the multiple Texas families to call on the Biden administration to bring their relatives and others home from detainment in Russia, Venezuela, Rwanda, Syria, and elsewhere.

Sources 

Organizations based in New Hampshire
Non-profit organizations based in New Hampshire